Opostegoides gephyraea is a moth of the family Opostegidae. It was described by Edward Meyrick in 1881. It is known from New South Wales in Australia.

Adults have been recorded in October.

References

Opostegidae
Moths described in 1881